The Plaxton Leopard is a coach bodywork manufactured by Plaxton. It was introduced in October 2013 as a replacement for the Plaxton Profile. Initially fitted to Volvo B9R chassis, it has since been adapted for the replacement Volvo B8R.

See also
List of buses

References

External links

Flick gallery
Leopard Brochure Plaxton

Leopard
Vehicles introduced in 2013
Coaches (bus)
Single-deck buses